Rafael Silvaido Landestoy Santana (born May 28, 1953) is a retired Major League Baseball player. Landestoy played eight major league seasons with the Houston Astros, Cincinnati Reds, and Los Angeles Dodgers. He amassed 291 hits, a .237 batting average, and four home runs, primarily as a middle infielder.

On October 10, 1984 he was released by the Los Angeles Dodgers.

Landestoy is now the manager for Tigres del Licey in the Dominican Republic.

He also currently serves as the International Field Coordinator for the New York Mets, a position he has held since 2008.

External links

1953 births
Living people
Albany-Colonie Yankees players
Albuquerque Dukes players
Caimanes del Sur players
Caribbean Series managers
Cincinnati Reds players
Daytona Beach Dodgers players
Detroit Tigers coaches
Dominican Republic expatriate baseball players in the United States
Fort Myers Sun Sox players
Gold Coast Suns (baseball) players 
Houston Astros players

Leones del Escogido players
Los Angeles Dodgers players
Major League Baseball players from the Dominican Republic
Major League Baseball second basemen
Minor league baseball managers
Montreal Expos coaches
Ogden Dodgers players
Orangeburg Dodgers players
People from Baní
Tigres del Licey players
Tucson Toros players
Waterbury Dodgers players